São Paulo is one of the 26 states of the Federative Republic of Brazil and has been inhabited since 12,000 BC, when the first indigenous people  came to the area. Portuguese and Spanish navigators arrived in the 15th century. In 1532, Portuguese explorer Martim Afonso de Sousa officially founded the first European settlement in Portuguese America, the village of São Vicente.

In the 17th century, the Bandeirantes stepped up exploration of the interior, and expanded Portugal’s territories of the Portuguese in South America even beyond the borders set by the Treaty of Tordesilhas.

After the Captaincy of São Paulo was instituted in the 18th century, the region increased in political importance, although it didn’t achieve significant economic or population growth until after the independence of Brazil.

Under the Empire of Brazil its economy was based on coffee plantations. In the second half of the 19th century, European immigrants increasingly replaced slave labor on plantations, mainly Italians attracted by the imperial government's offer of land. Increased coffee cultivation and the construction of the railroads drove the growth of the state's economy. In the 20th century, especially in the Vargas Era, state economic development especially centered on the industrial sector, which fueled production for all of Brazil.

São Paulo's population greatly increased in the modern era. It has one of the country's most urbanized populations, and today is one of the most diverse in the country, mainly descended from Italians, Portuguese, indigenous peoples, Afro-Brazilians, and migrants from other regions of the country. Other populations such as Arabs, Germans, Spanish, Japanese and Chinese also have a significant presence in the state.

Indigenous peoples 

Indigenous peoples have lived in São Paulo since approximately 12,000 BCE Around 1000, its coast was invaded by Tupi speakers from the Amazon rainforest. When Europeans arrived in the 16th century, the indigenous people on the coast were mostly Tupinambás, Tupiniquins and Carijós, with Macro-jê speakers in the interior.

European colonization 

The colonization of Brazil as a systematic policy of Portugal began when De Sousa founded São Vicente. Apparently, a nucleus of inhabitants already existed, and like other early settlements on the coast, probably began with castaways at the beginning of the 16th century. However, when it was officially founded by De Sousa on January 20, 1532, it effectively became the first landmark of colonial Brazil, near what is now the Baixada Santista.

The first European settlements at São Vicente were unofficial. The Bachelor of Cananeia, Portuguese  exile and castaway Cosme Fernandes Pessoa, according to many historians was the original founder of São Vicente, and actually governed and controlled trade in the region. A document dated 24 April 1499 found by the 19th-century Portuguese historian Jaime Cortesão suggests that  the Bachelor lived in Brazil before Pedro Álvares Cabral arrived in 1500: the document reports an unofficial trip by Bartolomeu Dias to Brazil. Another document, from 1526, describes São Vicente as a village of a dozen houses, only one of them built of stone, and one tower for defense.

De Sousa left for Brazil with several assignments. The first was to officially establish a colony in Brazil, confirming the power of the crown. When it was created, the first parliament was installed in America: the Chamber of the Vila de São Vicente, following the first elections held in the Americas. The name of São Vicente extended to the hereditary captaincy granted to De Sousa by the King of Portugal in 1534. Thus, São Paulo was initially known as the Captaincy of São Vicente.

Two friends of Pessoa had denounced him to the King of Portugal and in return received grants of land. They accused him of maintaining relations with Spaniards who lived further south, thereby endangering Portuguese domination in the region. Therefore De Souza was to remove Pessoa from power. 
Given advance warning of De Sousa’s intentions, the Bachelor put the settlement to the torch and withdrew with his people to Cananéia. De Sousa officially founded the village of São Vicente on the ruins of the prior settlement on January 22, 1532. In 1536 the Bachelor of Cananeia (or Bacharel Cosme) attacked, looted and burned the village, hanging Henrique Montes, the former friend who had betrayed him. This is the last historical mention of the Bachelor of Cananeia.

De Sousa distributed  land grants and constructed several buildings, then left on May 22, 1533, leaving São Vicente populated and organized. and its administration in the hands of his wife Ana Pimentel, the first grantee in Brazil. She in turn appointed Brás Cubas as Captain-Major and ombudsman for the Captaincy of São Vicente.

Amerigo Vespucci had on January 22, 1502 named São Vicente, after one of the patron saints of Portugal, Saint Vincent of Saragossa, while on a voyage to map the coast of Brazil. When he passed through the region, he found two islands, São Vicente Island and Santo Amaro. The cities of Santos and São Vicente are located on São Vicente today, and the city of Guarujá on the island of Santo Amaro.

The port of São Vicente suffered  the first major ecological disaster in Brazil: land near the sea had been cleared and farmed. Since the soil was sandy and had lost its protective layer, rains took the sand out to sea, silting the port of São Vicente, the only access to the Portuguese mainland. Given the loss of the port and the attack by the Bachelor of Cananeia on São Vicente, Cubas decided to set up a more sheltered port in the Enguaguaçu region. The fact that the name of this place was indigenous, not Portuguese, shows that the initiative was not official. The port was transferred in 1536, and a settlement established there which was later called Santos. Cubas attracted settlers there from the surrounding area and built the first Catholic mission in Brazil, Santa Casa (Holy House). The village of São Vicente went into decline.

Despite the difficulties of crossing the Serra do Mar, the fields of the plateau attracted settlers and made São Paulo an exception in early Portuguese colonization, which usually concentrated on the coasts. Looking for precious metals, the Portuguese crossed the Serra do Mar by an old indigenous route through Peabiru. In 1553, Portuguese settlers founded the Vila de Santo André da Borda do Campo.

The Jesuits, led by Manuel da Nóbrega in 1554 founded a college for Indians on a hill in Piratininga, which became the village of São Paulo de Piratininga, on the plateau beyond. The Portuguese also founded other villages on the plateau such as Santana de Parnaíba, thus guaranteeing the security and livelihood of São Paulo.

By 1560, Vila de Santo André was extinct and its residents moved to São Paulo de Piratininga.
The coastal strip, narrow due to the barrier of the Serra do Mar, lacked the necessary conditions for large-scale farming. In turn, the plateau faced the serious obstacle of the Caminho do Mar, which, instead of connecting, isolated the Piratininga region, denying it access to the ocean and, therefore, transportation. As a result the captaincy was prevented from successfully cultivating the main agricultural product of colonial Brazil, sugarcane, and from competing with the main sugar cultivation zones of the time, Pernambuco and Bahia.

Piratininga established a subsistence polyculture was based on the forced labor of indigenous people. The inventories of the first paulista settlers show few imports and a complete absence of luxury. Isolation created a peculiar society in the plateau. Arriving in São Paulo required particular strength to cross the mountains and withstand attacks by Indians, hunger, and disease. These living conditions determined the structure of their society in a more democratic way than in those established further north.

Although there were reports of Portuguese women in De Sousa’s fleet, no records of this have yet been found. The first known written record of Portuguese women in Brazil dates from 1550. Thus, the first wives were generally mamelucas (mestizo) or Indias (indigenous). More than anywhere else, the Portuguese in Sãp Paulo integrated certain cultural traits of the Tupis that allowed them to survive — and more, to take advantage of — the hostile backlands.

Bandeiras 

Economic difficulties and a spirit of adventure were important factors in the rush into the hinterland. This was the century of Bandeirantes, one in which the  offensive began, largely motivated by the profits to be made hunting indigenous peoples for slaves.

Due to their isolation, the  paulistas, as the residents of São Paulo are known, enjoyed considerable autonomy for the first two centuries in areas such as defense, indigenous relations, ecclesiastical administration, public works and municipal services, price controls and goods. The local governments, composed of "good men" of the land, were rarely limited to their legitimate attributions. São Paulo’s independence especially almost made the Portuguese government forget it.

The slaver , became the mining  when Borba Gato,  and others discovered gold veins in Minas Gerais and Mato Grosso. A hard ordeal was the effect of the discovery of gold on São Paulo and other villages on the plateau: all sought the immediate enrichment represented by the precious metal. As  said, "there were no Paulista who, more or less, stopped stroking the thought of discovering mines".

Thus, the population of the Brazilian backlands was made at the sacrifice of the inhabitants of São Paulo and at the expense of the population density of the captaincy. This demographic rupture, combined with the geographical factors already mentioned (the Serra do Mar), caused a fall in agricultural productivity, as well as a decline in other activities, which accentuated the people's poverty during the 18th century. The captaincy, which then covered the entire region of the gold discoveries, was transferred to the crown and got its own government in 1709, separate from the government of Rio de Janeiro, and with headquarters in town of São Paulo, elevated to city in 1711.

Gold rush and decline 

At the end of the 17th century,  from São Paulo discovered gold in the region of Rio das Mortes, close to the current São João del-Rei. The discovery of immense gold deposits provoked a race to Minas Gerais, as the numerous gold deposits were called at the time.

As discoverers of the mines, the  wanted exclusive rights to prospect for gold. They were defeated in 1710 with the end of the War of the Emboabas (War of the Newcomers) however, and lost control of Minas Gerais, which became an autonomous captaincy in 1721. The gold extracted from Minas Gerais was exported through Rio de Janeiro. As compensation, São Paulo was elevated to the status of city in 1711.

The exodus towards Minas Gerais caused the economic decline in the captaincy, and throughout the 18th century it lost territory and economic dynamism until it was simply annexed in 1748 to the captaincy of Rio de Janeiro. Thus, shortly before being annexed to Rio de Janeiro, São Paulo lost territory for the creation of 
These two captaincies today correspond to the states of Mato Grosso do Sul, Mato Grosso, Rondônia, Goiás, Tocantins, Federal District and the Triângulo Mineiro.

Some authors have contested this version of the captaincy's decay. The main argument that leads historians to defend this thesis is the stabilization of the number of villages that arose in the period. However, the number of inhabitants would not have decreased, only concentrated in the existing villages, and its population, despite not directly profiting from the mines, dominated the supply of food, mainly linked to livestock. The main justification for the annexation to Grosso was the security of the mines, since São Paulo would be their natural shield against invasions from Argentina or other Spanish colonies.

Return of the captaincy and Province of São Paulo 

The governor of Minas Gerais, on September 24, 1764 annexed the left bank of the Sapucaí River, extending the borders of Minas Gerais to roughly the current border with São Paulo, which never recovered the annexed territory, even after the captaincy was re-created. The region annexed by Minas Gerais continued to belong to Archdiocese of São Paulo however.

Sugar production was incentivized, to provide revenue. However, the captaincy retained only about a third of its original territory — the current states of São Paulo and Paraná, and part of Santa Catarina.

The  created the villages of Lages and Campo Mourão to defend the captaincy, as well as several other villages, which had not occurred since the beginning of the 18th century in São Paulo.

The villages of Campinas and Piracicaba were founded in eastern São Paulo, a favorable region for farming, where sugar cane grew quickly. Sugar was exported through the port of Santos, peaking at the beginning of the 19th century.

The captaincy of São Paulo gained political weight during the time of Independence of Brazil through José Bonifácio de Andrada. On September 7, 1822, Dom Pedro I proclaimed Brazilian independence on the banks of the Ipiranga Brook in São Paulo. In 1821 the captaincy became a province.

In 1820, John VI of Portugal annexed Lages to Santa Catarina, costing São Paulo a little more of its territory.

In 1853, the province of Paraná was created, and São Paulo lost territory for a final time, and has maintained its current territory from that date.

The current currencies of the state of São Paulo weren’t definitively fixed until the 1930s.

Coffee 
In 1817 the first coffee farm in São Paulo was founded in the Paraíba do Sul River valley. After independence, coffee cultivation became more prevalent in the Paraíba, rapidly enriching cities such as Guaratinguetá, Bananal, Lorena and Pindamonhangaba.

The coffee plantations of the Paraíba Valley used slave labor on a large scale, and sold the beans through Rio de Janeiro. As a result, the valley quickly enriched itself, creating a rural oligarchy. However, the rest of the province remained dependent on sugar cane and on the commerce in the city of São Paulo, driven by the establishment of a law school in 1827. São Paulo also began grow as a city, opening its first establishments for travelers, students and merchants who wanted to learn about the area or to establish projects. Pensions, hotels and inns began to be regulated and grew in number, providing options for accommodation, comfort and leisure.

However, soil exhaustion in the Paraíba Valley and the increasing restrictions imposed on the slavery regime led to a decline in the region’s coffee cultivation in 1860. The valley emptied itself economically and coffee cultivation moved towards the west of the province, beginning with the Campinas and Itu areas, where it replaced the sugar cane cultivated there until then.

The migration of coffee to the west caused major economic and social changes in the province. The 1850 ban on the Atlantic slave trade led to a need for a fresh source of labor for the new crops. The Imperial and provincial governments began to encourage European immigration. The flow of exports went through the port of Santos, which led to the establishment of the first railroad, the São Paulo Railway. Inaugurated in 1867, it was built by English financial capital and the Visconde de Mauá, and linked Santos to Jundiaí through São Paulo. It became an important trading post between the coast and the coffee-growing interior.

Coffee-growing gradually spread into western São Paulo, passing through Campinas, Rio Claro and Porto Ferreira. In 1870, it found its most fertile fields: Terra Roxa in northeastern São Paulo state, near Ribeirão Preto, São Carlos and Jaú, where the largest and most productive coffee farms in the world arose.

São Paulo's borders were defined with the emancipation of Paraná Province in 1853. The south of São Paulo (Vale do Ribeira and the region of Itapeva) did not attract coffee cultivation and suffered from border disputes between São Paulo and Paraná. This led to less development in the area compared to the rest of the province, making it yet one of the poorest regions of São Paulo.

The wealth created by coffee and the constant arrival of immigrants to the province, including Italians, Portuguese, Spanish, Japanese and Arabs, in addition to the development of a large network railroad, brought prosperity to São Paulo.

Old Republic and the coffee with milk politics 

When the republic was installed, the new state's economic predominance was clearly affirmed. If Brazil was coffee, coffee was São Paulo. This reality had repercussions in the national sphere, hence the homogeneity of 1894 to 1902, in three consecutive quadrenniums, under presidents Prudente de Morais, Campos Sales and Rodrigues Alves.

At the beginning of the 20th century, with the advance of the railroads towards the Paraná River, dozens of municipalities were created along the railroads:  Estrada de Ferro Sorocabana, NOB and Companhia Paulista de Estradas de Ferro. Western São Paulo was populated for the first time. The railways were built in the highest regions, most suitable for coffee, the so-called spikes, which were less subject to frost.

São Paulo entered the republican era with two trump cards: the wealth brought in by coffee and the free labor system, which had been introduced before the abolition of slavery and had already adapted and integrated into São Paulo's agricultural production. On the other hand, the local autonomy conferred by the new federative regime, in view of the broad rights conferred on the states, resulted in practice in real sovereignty. It came to politically and administratively reinforce the advantages conferred by the two factors above.

Thus equipped, benefiting from the institutional weakness resulting from the Proclamation of the Republic of Brazil, São Paulo combined its economic power with the electoral strength of Minas Gerais and established coffee with milk politics, a reference to São Paola coffee and Minas Gerais’ dairy production. This alliance resulted in a change in federalism in Brazil, whose results are still visible today. For this, the business vision of his businessmen, who were mainly coffee growers and even in the empire had learned to use political power in defense of their economic interests, also competed. They immediately perceived the opportunity to introduce 
foreign immigrants and subsidize them with resources from the province, since the imperial government paid more attention to the establishment of colonial nuclei than to salaried immigration. With the institution of the republican regime, they were able to expand their means of action. From then on, until the 1929 crash, they did not lose sight of the expansion and defense of the product that sustained the region's economy.

Despite internal dissension and several dissidents, the Partido Republicano Paulista (PRP) managed to maintain great cohesion in the face of the Union, which allowed it to carry forward a policy that generally satisfied dominant interests and undeniably contributed to the prestige of São Paulo within the federation.

However, the first republican moments in São Paulo were not peaceful. They reflected the agitations and mistakes that occurred at the federal level. As in the other states, a provisional governing board was established. Then governor Prudente de Morais was appointed, but soon resigned. The state government then passed to Jorge Tibiriçá, appointed by Deodoro da Fonseca.

In 1890 the era of political dissension was inaugurated within the PRP, with the opposition exerted by the Centro Republicano de Santos, which in an August 24, 1890 manifesto launched the candidacy of Américo Brasiliense de Almeida Melo. The faculty of law was agitated, while the main republican figures of São Paulo, such as Prudente de Morais, Manuel Ferraz de Campos Sales, Bernardino de Campos and Francisco Glicério de Cerqueira Leite, among others, were concerned about the authoritarianism of marshal Deodoro da Fonseca. He removed Jorge Tibiriçá and delegated power to Américo Brasiliense in 1891, who Deodoro da Fonseca considered the only one capable of organizing São Paulo.

Discontent worsened. Bitter polemics were fought between Campos Sales, through the newspaper , and Francisco Rangel Pestana, with the newspaper O Estado de S. Paulo as a mouthpiece. In this environment, on June 8, 1891, the Constituent Assembly was installed and, in July, Américo Brasiliense, already chosen president of the state, promulgated the first constitution in São Paulo.

Spirits seemed to calm when Deodoro da Fonseca's blow brought the excitement back to life. The capital and the countryside lived in apprehension under the threat of subversion of public order, which was spreading throughout the country. To avoid civil war, Deodoro resigned and the vice president, Floriano Peixoto, took over the presidency of the republic, and then received political and financial support from São Paulo against the uprisings that were spreading across the nation. In return, São Paulo assumed the hegemony of the federation with the election of Prudente de Morais in 1894, which started the series of civilian presidents.

Meanwhile, in the state, Américo Brasiliense handed over the government to Major Sérgio Tertuliano Castelo Branco, who soon passed it on to whoever was entitled: vice president José Alves de Cerqueira César. This, in the face of the spirit of riot and monarchical reaction that reigned, dissolved the Legislative Assembly, immediately called another Congress and deposed all the city councils of the state. Elections were held for deputies and senators for the second state legislature, which took place on April 7, 1892. Always showing determination and firmness, Cerqueira César called on the electorate to choose a new president of the state: Bernardino de Campos, the first São Paulo governor elected by direct suffrage.

After 1904, the mandates of the presidents of the state of São Paulo stabilized, every four years. Jorge Tibiriçá Piratininga reformed the police in São Paulo. In 1910, in a failed campaign, the  supported the candidacy of Rui Barbosa to the presidency of the republic, with the president of São Paulo Albuquerque Lins as their vice. Defeated Rui Barbosa and assuming the presidency Hermes da Fonseca, São Paulo took the risk of federal intervention in Salvations Policy, however, with the election of the Counselor Rodrigues Alves, president of São Paulo from 1912 to 1916, thanks to his prestige throughout Brazil, São Paulo escaped federal intervention.

The president of São Paulo from 1916 to 1920, Dr. Altino Arantes Marques, faced the Five Greats: the Great War, the great frost of 1918, the strikes of 1917, the Spanish flu and the invasion of locusts in the interior of São Paulo.

Dr. Washington Luís, who governed São Paulo from 1920 to 1924, revolutionized São Paulo with his motto "Governing is opening roads", and currently, 19 of the 20 best Brazilian highways are from São Paulo.

In 1924, during the Carlos de Campos presidency, the 1924 Revolution took place in São Paulo, which forced Carlos de Campos to withdraw from the capital. Destruction and depredation and bombing happened on the part of the federal government. The rebels were defeated and headed for the interior of Brazil.

Dr. Washington Luís came to the presidency of the republic in 1926; however, he was deposed on October 24, 1930.

Revolutions of 1930 and 1932 

On March 1, 1930, the president of São Paulo, Júlio Prestes, was elected president of the republic, obtaining 91% of the valid votes in São Paulo. The Brazilian Revolution of 1930 however prevented him from taking office, and also overthrew the sitting president, Washington Luís, who had been president of São Paulo from 1920 to 1924. São Paulo was then governed by the winners of the Revolution of 1930, and soon afterwards revolted, leading the Revolution of 1932. Júlio Prestes and Washington Luís were exiled. Newspapers that had supported the Progressive Republican Party (PRP) were shut down.

The 1930s in São Paulo were characterized, from an economic point of view, by efforts to adjust to the conditions created by the world crisis of 1929 and by the collapse of the price of coffee. From a political point of view, the period was marked by a struggle to recover São Paulo's hegemony in the federation, reached by 
and finally annihilated by the revolution of 1930. This submitted the state to the action of federal interventionists, who, at first, were not even from São Paulo.

Demands for a São Paulo government soon appeared, which, in the version of the winners of the Brazilian Revolution of 1930, was seen as an attempt to restore the hegemonic groups in São Paulo, whose economic and political interests were being harmed by the new situation. However, even some stakeholders, such as  sought to reconcile coffee growing with the new federal government guidance.

Accustomed to leading their own destiny, the ruling classes rose up under the leadership of the Democratic Party, then chaired by Professor Francisco Morato, precisely the party allied with Getulist revolution of 1930. The latter sought alliance with other states, particularly with the opposition gaúcha, but in the end the  rebelled, with the support only of troops from the State de Maracaju (now Mato Grosso do Sul).

On July 9, 1932, the constitutional revolution of São Paulo broke out. Pedro de Toledo of São Paulo was  proclaimed governor and governed the state. Battalions of volunteers were formed, and some army units, a strong contingent from Mato Grosso and almost all of the state public force joined the movement. Fifty thousand men initially mobilized, whose command fell to General Bertolo Klingler, and later to Colonel Euclides de Oliveira Figueiredo.

Industry participated in the revolution with enthusiasm. Internal supply lines were also organized. The fight lasted, however, only three months and ended with the defeat of the paulistas and the loss of hundreds of lives.

A few months after the surrender, the federal government, in order to pacify the country, decided to call elections for a Constituent assembly, responding to the main objective of the revolutionaries in São Paulo: the restoration of constitutional order. Meanwhile, São Paulo was under military occupation from October 1932 to August 1933. Former governor Pedro de Toledo, his secretariat, and other politicians who took an active part in the revolution were exiled.

Industrialization and metropolization 

After World War I, coffee cultivation faced crises of oversupply and competition from other countries. The government began to regulate by  coffee production to avoid these crises. Farms shut down, sending immigrant workers towards São Paulo.

Political pressures arose demanding an end to the predominance of the São Paulo coffee elite, and artistic movements, such as the 1922 Modern Art Week considered the beginning of Brazilian Modernism, propagated new social and economic ideas. External immigration decreased and strikes by anarchists and communists broke out in São Paulo as industrial empires formed, such as that of the Matarazzo family.

In 1930 coffee entered its last crisis, the Crisis of 1929, and the crash of the New York Stock Exchange the previous year, the collapse of overseas grain prices and the Brazilian Revolution of 1930, removed Paulistas from power.

Two years later, in 1932, São Paulo fought Getúlio Vargas in the Constitutionalist revolution in an attempt to retake the lost power, but was defeated militarily. The coffee crisis worsened and a rural exodus to the city of São Paulo emptied the interior of the state.

During the period of Estado Novo with Ademar de Barros as governor of the state and Francisco Prestes Maia mayor of the city of São Paulo, the state entered a new phase of development, with the construction of major highways and hydroelectric plants.

World War II interrupted imports and São Paulo industry began a process of import substitution, producing previously imported products. This process intensified under the Juscelino Kubitschek government, which laid the foundations of the automotive industry in the greater ABC Region.

To supply the necessary manpower, the state now receives millions of northeasterners, from the states of Bahia, Ceará, Pernambuco and Paraíba, who replace the earlier immigrants and now compose the São Paulo middle class as workers. These workers mainly live on the outskirts of São Paulo and in neighboring cities. This rapid population increase caused a process of metropolization, where São Paulo agglomerated with neighboring cities, forming the Metropolitan Region of São Paulo.

In 1960, the city of São Paulo became the largest Brazilian city and primary economic center in the country, surpassing Rio de Janeiro, due to the larger number of migrants to São Paulo.

Industrialization of the interior 

In the 1960s and 1970s, the state government promoted several projects to stimulate the economy of the interior, depopulated since the coffee crash in 1930.

The Via Dutra (BR-116) supported the recovery and industrialization of the Vale do Paraíba, concentrated around the aviation industry of São José dos Campos. To the west, Viracopos International Airport, the State University of Campinas (Unicamp), the opening of highways such as Rodovia Anhanguera, Rodovia dos Bandeirantes and Rodovia Washington Luís, and the implementation of modern production techniques, especially for sugarcane and its by-product, fuel alcohol, brought progress back to the Campinas, Sorocaba, Central Administrative Region, Ribeirão Preto and Franca regions.

This economic recovery in the interior accelerated in the 1980s, when countless urban problems, such as violence, pollution and disorderly occupation, afflicted the Metropolitan Region of São Paulo. Between 1980 and 2000 the vast majority of investments made in the state were made outside the capital, which changed from an industrial metropolis to a center of services and finance. The interior, especially the axes between Campinas – Piracicaba – São Carlos – Ribeirão Preto – Franca and Sorocaba – São José dos Campos – Taubaté, became industrialized and prosperous.

However, even with the enrichment and industrialization of the interior, other states have an even higher rate of economic growth than São Paulo, especially the South and Central-West regions.

Currently, although growth is lower and it faces competition from other states, São Paulo is the main economic and industrial hub of South America, the largest consumer market in Brazil.

See also 
 State of São Paulo
 City of São Paulo
 List of people from São Paulo

References

Bibliography

Environmental history
 JORDÃO, S. A contribuição da geomorfologia para o conhecimento da fitogeografia nativa do estado de São Paulo e da representatividade das Unidades de Conservação de Proteção Integral. Doctoral Thesis in Sciences, University of São Paulo, 2011. link.
 ENVIRONMENT SECRETARIAT (SECRETARIA DE MEIO AMBIENTE (SMA)). Nos Caminhos da Biodiversidade Paulista (Org. Marcelo Leite). São Paulo: Official Press, 2007.
 USTERI, A. Flora der umgebung der stadt São Paulo in Brasilien. Jena: G. Fischer, 1911. link.
 VICTOR, M. A. M. et al. Cem anos de devastação: revisitada 30 anos depois. Brasília: Ministry of the Environment, 2005. link.
 WANDERLEY, M.G.L. et al., coords. Flora Fanerogâmica do Estado de São Paulo. Botany Institute, São Paulo. 2001 – present. 8 vol. link.

Archeology and indigenous peoples
 AFONSO, Marisa Coutinho. Um painel da arqueologia pré-histórica no Estado de São Paulo: os sítios cerâmicos. Especiaria: Cadernos de Ciências Humanas, v. 11–12, n. 20–21, 2008–2009, p. 127-155, .
 DORNELLES, Soraia Sales. A questão indígena e o Império: índios, terra, trabalho e violência na província paulista, 1845-1891. Thesis (doctorate) - State University of Campinas, Institute of Philosophy and Human Sciences, Campinas, 2016, link.
 MONTEIRO, John et al. Índios no Estado de São Paulo: resistência e transfiguração. São Paulo: Yankatu, 1984, link.
 SCHADEN, Egon. Os primitivos habitantes do território paulista. Revista de História, v. 8, n. 18, p. 385-406, 1954.
 WICHERS, Camila Azevedo de Moraes. Mosaico Paulista: guia do patrimônio arqueológico do estado de São Paulo. São Paulo: Zanettini Arqueologia, 2010, .

Slavery
 QUEIROZ, Suely Robles Reis de. Escravidão negra em São Paulo: um estudo das tensões provocadas pelo escravismo no século XIX. Rio de Janeiro: Livraria J. Olympio Editora, 1977.

Coffee and industrialization
 DEAN, Warren. A industrialização de São Paulo (1880-1945). São Paulo: Difel, Edusp, 1971. [1a ed., 1969, link.]
 MILLIET, Sérgio. Roteiro do Café. São Paulo: Ed. Bipa, 1946.

Others
 BASSANEZI, Maria Silvia C. Beozzo; SCOTT, Ana Silvia Volpi; BACELLAR, Carlos de Almeida Prado; TRUZZI, O. M. S. Roteiro de fontes sobre a imigração em São Paulo 1850-1950. São Paulo: UNESP, 2008. 314p .
 GODOY, J. M. T. Identidade e regionalismo paulista: trajetória e mutações. Anais do XXVI Simpósio Nacional de História - ANPUH, São Paulo, July 2011, link. 
 SOUZA, Ricardo Luiz de. História regional e identidade: o caso de São Paulo. História & Perspectivas, Uberlândia, 36–37, 2007, pp. 389–411, .

External links 

 Full edition of the book History of the Captaincy of São Vicente Pedro Taques de Almeida Paes Leme (in PDF format)
 Memories for the history of the captaincy of S. Vicente, author Frei Gaspar da Madre de Deus

São Paulo (state)
History of São Paulo (state)